Adıyamanspor is a sports club located in Adiyaman, Turkey.

Adıyamaspor was founded as Adıyaman Gençlikspor in 1946. Adıyamanspor joined the professional leagues firstly 1983–1984 in TFF Third League. In 1992–1993 they promoted for TFF Second League.

External links
Official website

 
Sport in Adıyaman
Football clubs in Turkey
Association football clubs established in 1946
1946 establishments in Turkey